Guano Apes are an alternative rock band formed in 1994 in Göttingen, Germany. The group members are Sandra Nasić (vocals), Henning Rümenapp (guitars, backing vocals), Stefan Ude (bass, backing vocals) and Dennis Poschwatta (drums, backing vocals).

Their sound has been described as a fusion of metal, pop and rap. Usually, their music is labeled as alternative rock and alternative metal.

Their discography consists of five studio albums, one live album, two compilation albums, eighteen singles and five video albums.

Studio albums

Live albums

Compilation albums

Singles

  as Guano Babes featuring Michael Mittermeier

Music videos

Video albums

 Guano T-Apes (VHS, 1998)
 Don't Give Me Names (VHS & DVD, 2000)
 Live (DVD, 2003)
 Planet of the Apes / The Documentary (DVD) (2005)
 Guano Apes – Live @ Rockpalast (2012)

Guano T-apes is a video that documents the development of the Guano Apes from their beginning. With band and individual interviews you get to know the members of the band better and experience curiosities and events from daily life in the music business. Along with the video clips, it contains much live material shot during the tours from Nov. 1997 through the summer of 1998. The video was directed by Richard Anjou and edited by Mathias Dohmbrinck.

References

Discographies of German artists
Discography